Jared Zezel (born March 4, 1991) is an American curler. He competed in the 2014 Winter Olympics.

Career
At the 2013 United States Olympic Curling Trials Zezel was part of the first place team. At the qualification event for the 2014 Winter Olympics, Zezel's team won the second qualifier 8–5 over the Czech Republic to take the final 2014 Olympic qualification spot. At the Olympics Zezel's team finished 9th out of 10 teams with a final record of 2–7.

Zezel has competed in the United States Men's Curling Championship six times, every year from 2012 to 2017. His teams' best finish was 2nd in 2015.

References

External links

1991 births
Living people
American male curlers
Olympic curlers of the United States
Curlers at the 2014 Winter Olympics
Sportspeople from Hibbing, Minnesota